The Aby Lowland is a low alluvial plain located in the Sakha Republic, Far Eastern Federal District, Russia. Administratively most of the territory  of the lowland is part of Aby District (Aby Ulus).

Geography
The lowland is crossed by the Indigirka River in its middle course. Besides many smaller rivers and streams, three large left hand tributaries of the great river flow into it, the Selennyakh, Uyandina (with the Khatyngnakh) and Druzhina rivers. The Badyarikha limits the area in the east. The rivers are generally slow-flowing and meandering, connected by channels and with very boggy shores. The Aby Lakes, mostly small and numbering over 15,000, are dotting the lowlands. The largest are Lake Ozhogino and Lake Suturuokha.

The Aby Lowland is surrounded by mountains on all sides, with the Selennyakh Range and Esteriktyakh-Tas in the west, the Moma Range in the south and southeast, the Alazeya Plateau in the east and the Polousny Range in the north. The latter separates it from the Yana-Indigirka Lowland. 

In the winter the plains are frosty owing to stagnation of cold air. There is usually light snowfall. Summers are short, but with rather high temperatures considering the latitude.

See also
Druzhina, Sakha Republic

References

External links
Wetlands in Russia - Vol.4

East Siberian Lowland